Lisunovo is a rural locality (a settlement) in Savinskoye Rural Settlement, Pallasovsky District, Volgograd Oblast, Russia. The population was 119 as of 2010. There are 5 streets.

Geography 
Lisunovo is located on the right bank of the Torgun River, 41 km northeast of Pallasovka (the district's administrative centre) by road. Smychka is the nearest rural locality.

References 

Rural localities in Pallasovsky District